Veljković is a Serbian surname derived from a masculine given name Veljko. Notable people with the surname include:

Nataša Veljković (born 1968), Serbian pianist
Stefana Veljković (born 1990), Serbian volleyball player
Milenko Veljković (born 1995), Serbian basketball player
Miloš Veljković (born 1995), Serbian football player

Serbian surnames
Slavic-language surnames
Patronymic surnames
Surnames from given names